Róża Potocka may refer to:

 Róża Potocka (1780–1862)
 Róża Potocka (1849–1937)